Porozal is a district of the Cañas canton, in the Guanacaste province of Costa Rica.

History 
Porozal was created on 30 November 1995 by Decreto Ejecutivo 24809-G. Segregated from Cañas.

Geography 

Villages
Administrative center of the district is the village of Porozal.

Other villages in the district Brisas, Eskameca, Guapinol, Pozas, Puerto Alegre, Quesera, Santa Lucía, Taboga (partly) and Tiquirusas.

Demographics 

For the 2011 census, Porozal had a population of  inhabitants.

Transportation

Road transportation 
The district is covered by the following road routes:
 National Route 18

References 

Districts of Guanacaste Province
Populated places in Guanacaste Province